This is a list of National Cycle Routes in Zone 4 of the numbering scheme, namely: London (Greenwich) to Fishguard, in Wales, via Reading, Bath, Bristol, Newport, Caerphilly, Pontypridd, Swansea and Llanelli.

Single- and double-digits

Triple-digits

References

National Cycle Network